Horrible Harry is a children's book series written by Suzy Kline between 1988 and 2019. It is normally used in American elementary schools for teaching reading. It is based on a 3rd grader named Harry, and his misadventures are told through the words of his best friend, Doug. Harry's and Doug's friends are Sidney, Song Lee, Mary, Ida, and Dexter. His teacher is named Ms. Mackle. His principal is named Mr. Cardini. In addition to the Horrible Harry series, there is a short spin-off book series about Song Lee, also narrated by Doug. As of 2022, there are currently 41 books in the Horrible Harry franchise, including the 4 Song Lee books.

Horrible Harry titles
Horrible Harry in Room 2B
Horrible Harry and the Green Slime
Horrible Harry and the Ant Invasion
Horrible Harry's Secret 
Horrible Harry and the Christmas Surprise
Horrible Harry and the Kickball Wedding
Horrible Harry and the Dungeon
Horrible Harry and the Purple People
Horrible Harry and the Drop of Doom
Horrible Harry Moves Up to Third Grade
Horrible Harry at Halloween
Horrible Harry Goes to the Moon
Horrible Harry and the Dragon War
Horrible Harry and the Holidaze
Horrible Harry Goes to Sea
Horrible Harry and the Mud Gremlins
Horrible Harry and the Locked Closet
Horrible Harry and the Goog
Horrible Harry Takes the Cake
Horrible Harry and the Triple Revenge
Horrible Harry Cracks the Code
Horrible Harry Bugs the Three Bears
Horrible Harry and the Dead Letters
Horrible Harry on the Ropes
Horrible Harry Goes Cuckoo
Horrible Harry and The Secret Treasure
Horrible Harry and The June Box
Horrible Harry and The Scarlet Scissors
Horrible Harry and The Stolen Cookie
Horrible Harry and the Missing Diamond
Horrible Harry and the Hallway Bully
Horrible Harry and the Wedding Spies
Horrible Harry and the Top Secret Hideout
Horrible Harry and the Birthday Girl
Horrible Harry and the Battle of the Bugs
Horrible Harry and the Field Day Revenge!
Horrible Harry Says Goodbye

Song Lee Titles
Song Lee and the Hamster Hunt
Song Lee in Room 2B
Song Lee and the Leech Man
Song Lee and the "I Hate You" Notes

References

American children's novels
American children's book series
1980s children's books
Book series introduced in 1988